Mărcești may refer to several villages in Romania:

 Mărcești, a village in Căiuți Commune, Bacău County
 Mărcești, a village in Râșca Commune, Cluj County
 Mărcești, a village in Dobra Commune, Dâmbovița County

See also 
 Marcu (name)
 Mărculești (disambiguation)